The Canon EF-M lens mount, introduced in 2012, is a derivative of the Canon EF lens mount designed for use with the Canon EOS M mirrorless interchangeable-lens camera. The EF-M lens mount is one of Canon's two new systems for mirrorless cameras, the other being the RF mount.

The M system has an 18 mm flange focal distance (compared to 20 mm for RF and 44 mm for EF and EF-S) and a 47 mm throat diameter (compared to 54 mm for EF, EF-S, and RF). As it is designed for use with an APS-C-sized image sensor, it features the same crop factor (of roughly 1.6) as the existing EF-S lens mount.

The M system is somewhat limited as Canon has issued relatively few native lenses, listed below. There is a lack of native lenses with a large aperture, the exceptions being 22 mm 2.0 and 32 mm 1.4. In 2014, third party manufacturers started to present their M lenses. In addition, it is possible to use Canon EF and EF-S lenses (made for the Canon DSLRs) with an adapter. This solution reportedly works well also with regard to the autofocus, but it takes away the size advantage of the smaller M system. Suitable adapters (from EF to M or from EF-S to M) are made by Canon as well as third party manufacturers. As is common with mirrorless systems, the adapter solution is not backwards-compatible with Canon's DSLR cameras: this means that you cannot put M lenses on a non-M DSLR.

Compatibility 
The cameras that can use the EF-M mount are:

List of EF-M lenses from Canon

List of EF-M lenses from 3rd-party (AF only)

Images

References 

Camera lenses introduced in 2012
 
Lens mounts